Moonlighting is the debut album by the contemporary jazz ensemble the Rippingtons.  It was released in 1986 on the GRP label, and reached number 5 on Billboard's Jazz chart.
This is also the first appearance of the Jazz Cat on the album cover by artist Bill Mayer. The Jazz Cat has since been on the cover of every Rippingtons album.

Track listing and personnel 
(All songs written by Russ Freeman).

 "Moonlighting" - 6:41
 
 
 
 
 
 
She Likes to Watch - 5:33
 
 
 
 
 
 
Angela - 4:45
 
 
 
 
 
Dreams - 5:08
 
 
 
 
 
 
 
Mirage - 4:18
 
 
 
 
 
Calypso Cafe - 4:42
 
 
 
 
 
 
Open All Night - 4:48
 
 
 
 
 
 
Intimate Strangers - 5:40

Production 
 Russ Freeman – producer, arrangements, mixing
 Jim Snowden – executive producer 
 Steven Sharp – engineer, mixing 
 Steve Reid – mixing
 Bill Mayer – front cover artwork 
 Kathleen Covert – art direction, design

Charts

References

External links
The Rippingtons - Moonlighting at Discogs
The Rippingtons - Moonlighting at AllMusic
The Rippingtons Official Website

1986 debut albums
The Rippingtons albums
GRP Records albums